Hilversum is a city and municipality in the province of North Holland, Netherlands. Located in the heart of the Gooi, it is the largest urban centre in that area. It is surrounded by heathland, woods, meadows, lakes, and smaller towns. Hilversum is part of the Randstad, one of the largest conurbations in Europe, and the Amsterdam metropolitan area; it is about 22 km from the centre of Amsterdam and about 15 km from the city of Utrecht.

The city is home to the headquarters, studios, and broadcast stations of several major radio, television, and newspaper companies, such as the NOS. This means that Hilversum is known for being the mediastad (media city) of the Netherlands.

Town 
The town is known for its architecturally important Town Hall (Raadhuis Hilversum), designed by Willem Marinus Dudok and built in 1931.

Hilversum has one public library, two swimming pools (Van Hellemond Sport and De Lieberg), a number of sporting halls, and several shopping centers (such as Hilvertshof, Winkelcentrum Kerkelanden, De Riebeeckgalerij, and Winkelcentrum Seinhorst). Locally, the town center is known as het dorp, which means "the village".

Geography

Hilversum is located on the sandy, hilly parts of the Gooi, and has four hills: de closest to the centre of town in the Boomberg. then the Trompenberg (now a luxury residential area where a.o. the Brenninkmeijer family lives, of C&A-fame, and to the south the Hoorneboeg (25m) and two km easterly of that the Zwaluwenberg, where since 1950 the headquarters of the inspector-general of the armies is located. These hills date from the period of the Ice-age, when gletschers pushed walls of earth before them. Hilversum was the farthest southern edge the gletschers reached.

Surrounding towns are Nieuw-Loosdrecht, Bussum, Kortenhoef, Blaricum, Hollandsche Rading, Lage Vuursche, Maartensdijk, 's-Graveland, Laren, Nederhorst den Berg and Ankeveen.

Hilversum consists of the following districts and neighborhoods: Center (Langgewenstbuurt, Sint Vitusbuurt, Havenstraatbuurt and Centrum), Northwest (Nimrodpark, Trompenberg North, Trompenberg South, Media Park, Raadhuiskwartier and Boomberg), Northeast (North, Johannes Geradtswegbuurt, Erfgooiersbuurt and AZC Crailo), East (Geuzenbuurt, Electrobuurt, Astronomiebuurt, Science neighborhood, Kamrad, Kleine Driftbuurt and Liebergen), Southeast (Bloemkwartier Noord, Bloemenkwartier Zuid, Painterskwartier, 't Hoogt van' t Kruis, Arenaparkkwartier and West Indiëkwartier), Zuid (Writerskwartier, Staatsliedenkwartier and Zeeheldenkwartier), Southwest ( Kerkelanden, Havenkwartier, Zeverijn and Het Rode Dorp) and Hilversumse Meent. In 1767 Hilversum was still divided into 4 districts (quarters): the Neuquartier, Groestquartier, Kerkquartier and the Sandtbergerquartier.

The Oude Haven in the southwest is at the end of the Gooische Vaart. The construction of the canal between 's-Graveland and Hilversum was done in stages, so that it took 240 years. The canal was completed in 1876. Later, a modern harbor was dug, surrounded by an industrial estate. There is also a sports harbor.

International

Hilversum has a variety of international schools, such as the Violenschool and International School Hilversum "Alberdingk Thijm". Also, Nike's, Hunkemöller's and Converse's European headquarters are located in Hilversum.

History 
Earthenware found in Hilversum gives its name to the Hilversum culture, which is an early- to mid-Bronze Age, or 1800–1200 BC material culture. Artifacts from this prehistoric civilization bear similarities to the Wessex Culture of southern Britain and may indicate that the first Hilversum residents emigrated from that area. 

The first brick settlements formed around 900, but it was not until 1305 that the first official mention of Hilversum ("Hilfersheem" from "Hilvertshem" meaning "houses between the hills") is found. At that point it was a part of Naarden, the oldest town in the Gooi area.

Farming, raising sheep and some wool manufacturing were the means of life for the Gooi in the Middle Ages. In 1424 Hilversum received its first official independent status. This made possible further growth in the village because permission from Naarden was no longer needed for new industrial development.

The town grew further in the 17th century when the Dutch economy as a whole entered its age of prosperity, and several canals were built connecting it indirectly to Amsterdam.

In 1725 and 1766 large fires destroyed most of the town, leveling parts of the old townhouse and the church next to it. The town overcame these setbacks and the textile industry continued to develop, among other ways by devising a way to weave cows' hair.

In the 19th century a substantial textile and tapestry industry emerged, aided by a railway link to Amsterdam in 1874. From that time the town grew quickly with rich commuters from Amsterdam moving in, building themselves large villas in the wooded surroundings, and gradually starting to live in Hilversum permanently. Despite this growth, Hilversum was never granted city rights so it is still referred to by many locals as "het dorp," or "the village."

For the 1928 Summer Olympics in neighboring Amsterdam, it hosted all of the non-jumping equestrian and the running part of the modern pentathlon event.

The Nederlandse Seintoestellen Fabriek (NSF) company established a professional transmitter and radio factory in Hilversum in the early 1920s, growing into the largest of its kind in the Netherlands.

Following the defeat of Allied forces in the Netherlands in 1940, and its occupation by Nazi Germany, Hilversum became the headquarters of the German Army (Heer) in the Netherlands. On February 25 and 26, 1941, most of Hilversum's factories went on strike against the start of the Holocaust in the so-called February strike (Amsterdam Docker's Strike). Some 10,000 people took part. There is a yearly remembrance service since 2015. The Holocaust was the reason for 2,000 Hilversum Jews to lose their lives. The community has never recovered fully. Some 50 Hilversummers were awarded the title of Righteous among the nations from Yad Vashem. Viktor Kugeler,  one of Anne Frank's helper, was one of them.

In 1948, NSF was taken over by Philips. However, Dutch radio broadcasting organizations (followed by television broadcasters during the 1950s) centralised their operations in Hilversum, providing a source of continuing economic growth.  The concentration of broadcasters in Hilversum has given it its enduring status as the media city for the Netherlands.

In 1964, the population reached a record high – over 103,000 people called Hilversum home. However, the textile industry had started its decline; only one factory, Veneta, managed to continue into the 1960s, when it also had to close its doors. Another major industry, the chemical factory IFF, also closed by the end of the 1960s.

After the 1960s, the population gradually declined, until stabilising at around 85,000. Several factors other than the slump in manufacturing have featured in this decline: one is the fact that the average family nowadays consists of fewer people, so fewer people live in each house; second, the town is virtually unable to expand because all the surrounding lands were sold by city architect W.M. Dudok to the Goois Natuurreservaat (nl). The third reason for this decline of the population was because the property values were increasing rapidly in that moment of time, and many people were forced to move to less expensive areas in the Netherlands.

Some sources blame connections in the television world for attracting crime to Hilversum; the town has had to cope with mounting drug-related issues in a community with higher than average unemployment and ongoing housing shortage.

Hilversum was one of the first towns to have a local party of the populist movement called Leefbaar ("liveable"). Founded by former social-democrat party strongman Jan Nagel, it was initially held at bay for alderman positions. In 2001, Nagel from Leefbaar Hilversum teamed up with Leefbaar Utrecht leaders to found a national Leefbaar Nederland party. By strange coincidence, in 2002 the most vocal Leefbaar Rotterdam politician Pim Fortuyn was shot and killed by an animal rights activist at Hilversum Media Park just after finishing a radio interview. This happened, however, after a break between Fortuyn and Nagel during a Leefbaar Nederland board meeting in Hilversum on Fortuyn's anti-Islamic viewpoints.

The town of Hilversum has put a great deal of effort into improvements, including a recent renovation to its central train station, thorough renovation of the main shopping centre (Hilvertshof), and development of new dining and retail districts downtown including the "vintage" district in the Leeuwenstraat. Several notable architectural accomplishments include the Institute for Sound and Vision, and Zanderij Crailoo (nl), the largest man-made wildlife crossing in the world.

The nearby Media Park was the scene of the 2002 assassination of politician Pim Fortuyn; in 2015, a gunman carrying a false pistol stormed into Nederlandse Omroep Stichting's headquarters, demanding airtime on the evening news.

The population declined from 103,000 in 1964 to 84,000 in 2006, but rose again to 90.000 in 2018. The decline is mostly due to the fact that families are smaller these days.

Culture

The large Catholic neo-gothic St. Vitus church (P.J.H. Cuypers, 1892, bell tower 96 metres; 315').

The city played host to many landscape artists during the 19th century, including Barend Cornelis Koekkoek.

In the 1950s and 1960s the city played host to a major European Tennis tournament.

The 1958 Eurovision Song Contest took place in Hilversum.

In 2020 the international television event Eurovision: Europe Shine a Light was broadcast from Studio 21 in Hilversum's Media Park. This event was held in place of the Eurovision Song Contest 2020 which was cancelled due to the COVID-19 pandemic.

Broadcasting 

Hilversum is often called "media city", since it is the principal centre for radio and television broadcasting in the Netherlands, and is home to an extensive complex of radio and television studios and to the administrative headquarters of the multiple broadcasting organizations which make up the Netherlands Public Broadcasting system. Hilversum is also home to many newer commercial TV production companies. Radio Netherlands, which had been broadcasting worldwide via shortwave radio since the 1920s, was also based in Hilversum until it was dissolved in 2013.

The following is a list of organizations that have, or are continuing to, broadcast from studios in Hilversum:

One result of the town's history as an important radio transmission centre is that many older radio sets throughout Europe featured Hilversum as a pre-marked dial position on their tuning scales.

Dutch national voting in the Eurovision Song Contest is normally co-ordinated from Hilversum.

Transport

Airport

Hilversum Airport is located in the southwest of the municipality. Next to it is the former Marine Training Camp (MOK), now Corporal Van Oudheusden Barracks for the medical troops. In wartime the airfield was developed by the nazi's. They also set up an assembly line the for training aircraft, produced by Fokker in Weesp. The history of this airfield in the period 1940-1945 is described in the book 'Airfields in Wartime', written by members of the Air War Study Group 1939-1945 and published in November 2009 by the Netherlands Institute for Military History.

Railway 
Hilversum is well connected to the Dutch railway network, and has three stations.

Public buses 
Most local and regional buses are operated by Connexxion, but two of the bus routes are operated by Syntus Utrecht and two others by U-OV and Pouw Vervoer. Regional bus route 320 is operated by both Connexxion and Pouw Vervoer. In 2018, major road works started to make room for a new BRT bus lane from Hilversum to Huizen, set to open in early 2021.

Local bus lines

Regional bus lines

Local government

The municipal council of Hilversum consists of 37 seats, which are divided as follows since the last local election of 2018:

 Hart voor Hilversum - 8 seats
 D66 – 7 seats
 VVD – 6 seats
 GroenLinks – 5 seats
 CDA – 4 seats
 SP – 2 seats
 PvdA – 2 seats
 ChristenUnie – 2 seats
 Leefbaar Hilversum – 1 seat

Government

After the 2018 elections, the municipal government was made up of aldermen from the political parties Hart voor Hilversum, D66 and VVD.

The mayor of Hilversum is Gerhard van den Top.

It was the first city with a "Leefbaar" party (which was intended as just a local party). Today, Leefbaar Hilversum has been reduced to only 1 seat, but some other parties have their origins in Leefbaar Hilversum:
 Hart voor Hilversum. Originated from a Leefbaar Hilversum separation party called DLPH, which won 1 seat in the 2006 elections. Leadership was taken over in 2006 by Leonie Sazias, a TV celebrity. Leonie Sazias later changed the party name to Hart voor Hilversum. She won 3 seats in the 2010 elections and increased her influence to 6 seats in 2014. They won the 2018 elections and have 8 seats now.
 Hilversum 1. Was founded by Hans Roos, originally a council member for Hart voor Hilversum, but due to disagreements with the party on the list of candidates for the elections in 2014, decided to split and start his own party in 2013.

Notable residents

Notable people born in Hilversum:

Public service & public thinking 
 H. A. Sinclair de Rochemont (1901–1942) a Dutch fascist and later a Nazi collaborator 
 Jan van den Brink (1915–2006) a Dutch politician and businessman
 Joop den Uyl (1919–1987) Prime Minister of the Netherlands 1973 to 1977
 Wilhelmus Luijpen (1922–1980) a Dutch philosopher, Catholic priest of the Order of St. Augustine and an existential phenomenologist
 Ineke van Wetering (1934-2011) a Dutch anthropologist who studied witchcraft in Suriname
 Hubert van Es (1941-2009), war journalist in Vietnam
 John Gerretsen (born 1942), politician in Ontario, Canada
 Ernst Bakker (1946–2014) a Dutch politician, Mayor of Hilversum 1998 to 2011
 Olga Fischer (born 1951) a Dutch linguist and academic 
 Bartha Knoppers (born 1951), a Canadian lawyer 
 André Rouvoet (born 1962), a retired Dutch politician
 Janneke Raaijmakers (born 1973) a Dutch historian of the Middle Ages, focus on the Fulda monastery

The arts 
 Jan Teulings (1905–1989) a Dutch actor
 Emmy Lopes Dias (1919–2005) a Dutch stage, radio, and TV actress and advocate for the right to die
 Pim Jacobs (1934–1996) a Dutch jazz pianist, composer and TV presenter
 Chris Hinze (born 1938) a Dutch former pianist, now jazz and New Age flautist
 Harry van Hoof (born 1943) a Dutch conductor, composer and music arranger
 Harmke Pijpers (born 1946) a Dutch journalist and radio and TV presenter
 Dick Diamonde (born 1947) a retired Dutch Australian bass guitar player
 Ton Scherpenzeel (born 1952), keyboardist and founder of the Dutch rock band Kayak
 Pim Koopman (1953–2009), drummer of the Dutch progressive rock band, Kayak
 Max Werner (born 1953), former lead singer and drummer of the rock band Kayak
 Erland Van Lidth de Jeude (1953–1987), a Dutch-American actor, opera singer and amateur wrestler
 Arjan Ederveen (born 1956) a Dutch actor, comedian, TV scriptwriter and TV director
 Luc Leestemaker (1957–2012) an American abstract expressionist artist
 Arjen Anthony Lucassen (born 1960), a Dutch singer, songwriter, musician and record producer
 Bert Boeren (born 1962) a Dutch jazz trombonist and educator
 Ruud de Wild (born 1969) a Dutch radio host
 Dave Luza (born 1974), an improvisational comedian
 Liza Ferschtman (born 1979) a Dutch classical violinist
 Marieke Blaauw (born 1979) a Dutch animator
 Nicolette Kluijver (born 1984) a Dutch TV presenter and former model
 Lucas & Arthur Jussen, Lucas (born 1993) and Arthur (born 1996) are brothers and form a piano duo. 
 Sick Individuals (founded 2010) a Dutch electronic dance music act
 Christina Mahler , Canadian chellist

Science & business 
 J. W. B. Gunning (1860–1913), Dutch physician and museum director in South Africa
 Joop van Oosterom (1937–2016), Dutch billionaire and chess and billiards sponsor
 Bessel Kok (born 1941), Dutch businessman and chess organiser 
 Wim van den Brink (born 1952), Professor of Psychiatry and Addiction at the University of Amsterdam
 Henkjan Honing (born 1959), Professor of Music Cognition at the University of Amsterdam
 John de Mol (born 1955), media tycoon and TV producer 
 Pieter Geelen (born 1964), Dutch entrepreneur, co-developed the Mapcode
 Olaf Swantee (born 1966), Dutch businessman, former CEO of EE Limited

Sport 

 de Looper brothers, Henk (1912–2006) and Jan (1914–1987) Dutch field hockey players and bronze medallists at the 1936 Summer Olympics
 Nel van Vliet (1926–2006) a breaststroke swimmer, gold medallist at the 1948 Summer Olympics
 Roel Wiersma (1932–1995) a Dutch footballer, 316 club caps with PSV Eindhoven
 Geertje Wielema (1934–2009) a freestyle and backstroke swimmer, silver medallist at the 1952 Summer Olympics
 Hermsen brothers, Henk (born 1937), André (born 1942) and Wim (born 1947), water polo players
 Mary Kok (born 1940) a renowned Dutch swimmer
 Adrie Lasterie (1943–1991) a Dutch swimmer, silver medallist at the 1964 Summer Olympics 
 Evert Kroon (born 1946), water polo goalkeeper, bronze medallist at the 1976 Summer Olympics
 :nl:John van Altena (born 1947) 107 caps, Dutch National Rugby XV
 Ton van Klooster (born 1954), freestyle swimmer and swimming coach, competed at the 1972 Summer Olympics
 Nico Landeweerd (born 1954), water polo player, bronze medallist at the 1976 Summer Olympics 
 Andy Hoepelman (born 1955), water polo player, bronze medallist at the 1976 Summer Olympics 
 Albert Voorn (born 1956) a Dutch equestrian and silver medallist at the 2000 Summer Olympics 
 Alex Boegschoten (born 1956) a former water polo player, bronze medallist at the 1976 Summer Olympics 
 Hansje Bunschoten (born 1958–2017), swimmer and TV presenter, competed at the 1972 Summer Olympics
 Ellen Bontje (born 1958), equestrian, team medallist at the 1992 and 2000 Summer Olympics 
 Reggie de Jong (born 1964), freestyle swimmer, bronze medallist at the 1980 Summer Olympics
 Jelle Goes (born 1970) a Dutch football manager
 Pieta van Dishoeck (born 1972) a retired rower, won two medals at the 2000 Summer Olympics
 Davy Klaassen (born 1993) a Dutch professional footballer with 180 club caps

Gallery

See also
Gemeentelijk Gymnasium Hilversum

References

External links

Official website

 
Cities in the Netherlands
Municipalities of North Holland
Populated places in North Holland
Venues of the 1928 Summer Olympics
Olympic equestrian venues
Olympic modern pentathlon venues
Articles containing video clips